Eremophila nivea, commonly known as silky eremophila, is a flowering plant in the figwort family, Scrophulariaceae and is endemic to Western Australia. In nature it is a rare shrub with hairy branches and leaves, and blue, purple or violet flowers.

Description
Its branches, leaves and sepals are covered with a layer of soft white to greyish matted hairs giving the plant a silvery-greyish appearance.

The petal tube is lilac-coloured, white with yellow-brown spots inside. The outer surface of the tube and both surfaces of the lobes are glabrous but the inside of the tube is filled with long, soft hairs. The 4 stamens are fully enclosed in the petal tube.

Taxonomy
The first formal description of this species was published in 1986 by botanist Robert Chinnock and the description was published in Nuytsia. The specific epithet (nivea) is a Latin word meaning "snowy" or "snow-white" in reference to the colour of the hairs on the branches and leaves of this species.

Distribution and habitat
Eremophila nivea is only known in the wild from near Three Springs in the Avon Wheatbelt and Yalgoo biogeographic regions. Only a few populations are known, some of which are in danger of roadworks as they occur on road verges. It grows in sandy clay and clay-loam.

Conservation
This species is classified as "Threatened Flora (Declared Rare Flora — Extant)" by the Department of Environment and Conservation (Western Australia) and an Interim Recovery Plan has been prepared.

Use in horticulture
Although rare in nature, silky eremophila is often available in specialist nurseries with its popularity in part due to its soft, silvery-grey foliage and pale to deep blue flowers. A form with white flowers is also sometimes available. It can be propagated from cuttings or by grafting onto Myoporum rootstock and opinion amongst horticulturalists differ on which is the better method. It will grow in most soils, is both drought and frost tolerant but needs to be grown in full sun. It benefits from regular pruning after flowering to preserve its shape and to help prevent fungal diseases.

References

Eudicots of Western Australia
nivea
Endemic flora of Western Australia
Rare flora of Australia
Plants described in 1986
Taxa named by Robert Chinnock